Flamengo is a neighborhood in Rio de Janeiro, Brazil.

History 
It is the Portuguese word  for Flemish, and it was given to the nearby beach (Praia do Flamengo, Beach of the Flemish) because it was the place where the Dutch sailor Olivier van Noort tried to invade the city in 1599. At that time, the Dutchmen were called "Flemish" by the Portuguese.

Characteristics 
It is located between Catete and Botafogo districts on the edge of Guanabara Bay. The beachfront area is dominated by the Brigadier Eduardo Gomes Park, also known as Aterro do Flamengo, built by Lota de Macedo Soares on nearly 300 acres (1.2 km²) of land reclaimed from the bay and completed in 1965. The park features gardens designed by well-known Brazilian landscape designer Roberto Burle Marx.

The district and surroundings are serviced by three subway stations: Flamengo, Largo do Machado and Catete, and many bus lines that link it to the rest of the city. It is fairly close to the city centre and offers excellent views of Pão de Açúcar (Sugarloaf Mountain) and the statue of Christ the Redeemer. Nowadays, it is mostly a middle-class residential neighborhood.

Its main streets are Senador Vergueiro, Marquês de Abrantes and Praia do Flamengo.

Destinations
Carmen Miranda Museum
Flamengo Park—Parque Brigadeiro Eduardo Gomes
Marina da Glória
Monument to the Dead of World War II
Museum of Modern Art, Rio de Janeiro

Notable residents
Zózimo Bulbul, actor and filmmaker

References

Beaches of Rio de Janeiro (city)
Neighbourhoods in Rio de Janeiro (city)
Guanabara Bay